Luke Ward-Wilkinson (born 7 August 1993, Cambridge, England) is an English actor and singer.

Career

He is best known for his lead role as the teenage Simon Doonan in the BBC comedy series Beautiful People which ran for 2 series (2008–2009) on BBC Two.

Ward-Wilkinson also played Evan Adams in the ITV drama series Wild at Heart, Ensign Percival Beauclare in the 2008 ITV drama Sharpe's Peril and Thomas McDowell in The Christmas Miracle of Jonathan Toomey.

He also played 'Scott' in 2005 series 'The Secret of Eel Island'.

In 2015, Luke made his return to acting, starring as Ralph in the 2015-16 UK tour of Lord of the Flies. Also in 2015, in October, Luke guest starred in an episode of BBC One's Doctors and, in December, he guest starred in BBC One's Luther.

Education and training

He attended The Netherhall School and Parkside Community College in Cambridge and also went to the Mackenzie School of Speech and Drama, as well as the King Slocombe School of Dance. He has also belonged to the Young Actors Company (previously known as Whizz Kids) and was preparing to take a Bronze Medal in Acting.

Credits

The Secret of Eel Island - Scott (2005–2007)
Wild at Heart - Evan Adams (2006–2009)
The Christmas Miracle of Jonathan Toomey - Thomas McDowell (2007)
Love Does Grow on Trees - Danny (2008)
Sharpe's Peril - Ensign Percival Beauciere (2008)
Beautiful People - Simon Doonan (2008–2009)
Luther - Owen Woodward (2015)

References

External links 
 

English male television actors
1993 births
Living people
English male child actors